Artakha is a small village located in Awan Patti, Muzaffarabad district, Azad Kashmir, Pakistan. 

Populated places in Muzaffarabad District